Modesto Carriegas Pérez (Arcentales, 1932 – Baracaldo, 1979) was a victim of the terrorism of ETA, candidate for the Congress of Deputies of the Coalition Unión Foral del País Vasco.

Biography 
Modesto Carriegas was born in Arcentales, married and father of 5 children, murdered on September 13, 1979, at 47 years old. He lived in Baracaldo, where he ran an office of the Banco Hispano Americano. He had attended as a candidate for the Congress of the Deputies of the coalition Unión Foral del País Vasco, occupying the second position of the list.

Modesto had suffered an attack prior to his murder. On January 27. He was the victim of a robbery and kidnapping at the hands of ETA, which it took place in the branch of Banco Hispano Americano, where he was working. In that attack, four members of the terrorist group entered into the office, which were made with ten million pesetas. The ETA members took Modesto to Baracaldo's station and introduced him in a train with destination to Bilbao. Once they were there, they freed him in a bar, but not before warning him to stay there until nine a.m. The objective of taking him hostage was that the employees of the branch delayed the report of the theft

Murder 
On September 13, 1979, Modesto left his house around 8 a.m., going to the Banco Hispano Americano's office. Three members of ETA participated in this attack, of whom two had hidden in the stairs that were going down to the basement of his home. Modesto used to descend the stairs on foot. He was approached next to the elevator, where he was subsequently shot four times from close range, two hitting the head and two the stomach. There were no eyewitnesses of the facts even though his neighbours and relatives listened to the four detonations with clarity. The employees from a bank branch located in the adjoining portal came to help him, he was found with one hand on the stomach. José Reparaz Fernández also went to his aid, a doctor and neighbour of the deceased, who had heard the shots in a kiosk near the place of the scene. Shortly after his own wife came down, alerted by the gunshots. He was taken by ambulance to the hospital of Cruces, where he entered without life.

The assassins had stolen at gunpoint a white Seat 127 in the town of Portugalete, Biscay, about an hour before the attack. The owner was forced to give them the keys and received orders not to give an account of the events until a few hours has passed. It was in this car that the third individual was waiting for them to flee after making the shots. After the attack, this vehicle was found by the National Police in Portugalete. After the murder, the Modesto Carriegas's family received a letter from ETA in which they were required to leave Baracaldo.

Concerning the procedural situation of this murder, the National Court declared the summary and dismissal concluded provisionally on December 26 of the same year of the crime, considering that the relevant investigations were not fruitful. ETA's military branch claimed responsibility for this murder two days later through a communiqué. The procedural situation of this assassination is of provisional dismissal. Therefore, the material authors of the attack have not been condemned, nor have been an investigation that attributes these facts to any member of the terrorist group ETA.

Bibliography 

 MERINO, A., CHAPA, A., Raíces de Libertad. pp. 29–39. FPEV (2011). 
 This article makes use of material translated from the corresponding article in the Spanish-language Wikipedia.

References 

People's Party (Spain) politicians
People killed by ETA (separatist group)
Assassinated Spanish politicians
1932 births
1979 deaths